Huiliches is a department located in the south of Neuquén Province, Argentina.

Geography
The Department limits at north with Aluminé Department, Catán Lil Department at northeast, Collón Cura Department at southeast, Lácar Department at south and Chile at east. 

Departments of Neuquén Province